USS Taganak (AG-45) – also known as USS Lake Shore (ID-1792) – was a commercial cargo ship acquired by the U.S. Navy during World War I as Lake Shore. She was again reacquired during World War II as Taganak. During both wars she carried a variety of cargo for the Navy, including coal, ammunition, and general cargo. She survived both wars and was returned to civilian service after each war.

Constructed in Ohio 
Taganak (AG-45) was built in 1917 as War Shell at Toledo, Ohio, by the Toledo Shipbuilding Company. Acquired by the United States Shipping Board and delivered to the United States Navy for use as a mine carrier, the ship was renamed Lake Shore, commissioned at Philadelphia, Pennsylvania, on 11 January 1918, and assigned to the Naval Overseas Transportation Service (NOTS).

World War I service as Lake Shore 
Lake Shore was refitted at Philadelphia, Pennsylvania, armed with one 5-inch gun and one six-pounder, manned with a complement of 64, and got underway for Hampton Roads, Virginia, on 7 February. The ship loaded a cargo of coal there and sailed for Boston, Massachusetts, arriving on the 17th. After discharging her cargo, Lake Shore returned to Norfolk, Virginia, on the 27th. She then loaded coal and mines for the North Sea barrage, sailed for Scotland on 7 March, and arrived at Lamlash on the 29th.

The steamer returned to Norfolk, Virginia, on 5 May and sailed on the 18th for Boston where she received an extensive overhaul. On 17 June, she proceeded, via New York City, to Norfolk where she loaded mines and general cargo. Her convoy sailed on 27 June for Scotland and reached Corpach on 15 July.
 
Lake Shore returned to Norfolk on 18 August. She made two more trips from Hampton Roads to Europe—one back to the British Isles and one to France—before returning home on 6 February 1919. She was decommissioned on 5 March 1919 and returned to the Shipping Board the next day.

Post-war decommissioning
In 1923, Lake Shore was sold to the E. K. Wood Lumber Company, Inc., of San Francisco, California, and renamed Olympic. The steamer was operated by the lumber company along the Pacific coast until it was withdrawn from service in 1940.

World War II service as Taganak 
Early in World War II, to relieve its acute shortage of cargo ships, the Navy reacquired Olympic on 23 May 1942. Following repairs, alterations, and refitting at Mare Island, the ship was commissioned as Taganak (AG-45) on 23 July 1942.
 
Taganak, formally purchased on 28 September 1942, sailed for the South Pacific, via Pearl Harbor, in late October. Upon her arrival at Nouméa, New Caledonia, she was sent to New Zealand to return with a load of lumber. The ship then shuttled cargo between New Zealand, New Caledonia, New Hebrides, and the Solomon Islands for the next year.

Attacked by a Japanese submarine
On 19 August 1943, Taganak was a few hours out of Nouméa en route to Espiritu Santo with a cargo of ammunition when she was attacked by a Japanese submarine.  attacked the enemy with depth charges and forced it to the surface. Rescue efforts succeeded in saving a few survivors.

On 26 October, Taganak stood out of Tutuila, American Samoa, and headed for the United States laden with copra. The ship arrived at San Pedro, California, on 19 November; discharged her cargo, and moved to Oakland, California, for an overhaul.
 
On 11 February 1944, Taganak sailed for the South Pacific to resume shuttling inter-island cargo. She put into Auckland, New Zealand, on 6 February 1945 for repairs and then plied the waters of the South Pacific Ocean carrying cargo until after hostilities with Japan ended. The old steamer departed Tutuila on 30 September and headed for the United States.

Post-war decommissioning 
She arrived at San Francisco on 26 October 1945; was decommissioned at Vallejo, California, on 25 March 1946; was struck from the Navy List on 12 April; and was sold on 15 November 1946 to the Pillsbury and Martignoni Co., San Francisco, for scrap.

References
 
 NavSource Online: Service Ship Photo Archive - Lake Shore (ID 1792) - AG-45 Taganak
 Photo gallery at Naval Historical Center

Ships built in Toledo, Ohio
World War I auxiliary ships of the United States
World War II auxiliary ships of the United States
1917 ships
Cargo ships of the United States Navy
Lake ships
Ships built by the Toledo Shipbuilding Company